Rhoifolin is a chemical compound. It is first isolated from plant Rhus succedanea. The term "Rhoi" derived from generic name of plant Rhus. It is a flavone, a type of flavonoid isolated from Boehmeria nivea, China grass or ramie (leaf), from Citrus limon, Canton lemon (leaf), from Citrus x aurantium, the bigarade or bitter orange (plant), from Citrus x paradisi, the grapefruit (leaf), from Ononis campestris, the cammock (shoot) and from Sabal serratula, the serenoa or sabal fruit (plant).

References
 

 

Flavone glycosides